Shirley Fields Cooper (born December 8, 1943) is a former teacher and Democratic politician. First elected to the Virginia House of Delegates in 1982 after serving on the York County Board of Supervisors, she remained in the chamber for seven full terms before being defeated for reelection by real estate broker Jo Ann Davis in 1997.

References

External links
 

1943 births
Democratic Party members of the Virginia House of Delegates
20th-century American politicians
Christopher Newport University alumni
Living people
People from Southern Pines, North Carolina
20th-century American women politicians
Women state legislators in Virginia